Changanassery Parameswaran Pillai (March 1877 – 30 June 1940) popularly Changanassery, was a social reformer, lawyer, judge, attorney general and the former president of the Nair Service Society. He was elected four times to the Sree Moolam Popular Assembly.

Early life
Pillai was born in Changanassery, Kingdom of Travancore. His father was Vazhappilly Narayana Pillai from Vadakkekara Puthukutty house and his mother was Narayani Amma from Manakkat House.

His primary education was in Vazhappally and Changanassery. After completing BA, he took up the role as a lawyer after passing the LL.B. He was one of the founders of the Kollam Bar Association.

Biography
Pillai raised his voice for civil liberties and accountability of the Travancore legislative assembly and the government. He has been given an opportunity to work closely with Mahatma Gandhi. He was the Central Committee member of the Harijan Seva Sangham and Chairman of the Kerala branch. As a result of his efforts he opened 82 Harijan offices in Kerala.

He played a leading role in the struggle against untouchability. He was accompanied by Mannathu Padmanabha Pillai in Savarna Jadha as part of Vaikom Satyagraha.

Nair Service Society
Pillai was the second President of the Nair Service Society and he was one of the founders. He also served as the President of the Kerala Agricultural Farmers Association.

The Nair Regulation Act was passed in the Travancore Assembly and was one of his foremost accomplishments. He also served as the President of the Kerala Karshaka Sangh Committee.

High Court Judge
In 1926 he was appointed as the High Court judge of Travancore. After six years he resigned from the High Court, and again entered the public domain. That was the fourth time the Assembly elections have taken place. Later, the government canceled his pension for political reasons.

President of the National Congress of Travancore Branch Committee
In 1938, the branch of the Indian National Congress as part of Travancore, Thiruvananthapuram established. Pillai was selected as the first president and G. Ramachandran as the first secretary. Soon before the All India Congress Committee of 1938, the Indian National Congress, which was presided over by Pattabhi Seetharamaiah at Travancore constituency, played an important role. The conference demanded the immediate task of establishing a responsible government in Cochin and Travancore. The three states, Malabar, Cochin, and Travancore agreed to organize the event as a sub federation.

In February 1938, the Haripura Conference of the Indian National Congress movement decided that the Indian National Congress committees in the country should not be actively involved in political movements in the country and encourage free political organizations to advance political agitations. Since the Indian National Congress took over the leadership of the eight British Indian state governments, the leadership of the Indian National Congress did not have to carry out the struggle for responsible governance in the princely states.

In the context of Haripura AICC decision, in February 1938, the C.V. Narayana Pillai,  an Advocate in Thiruvananthapuram and V. Kunhiraman presided over the decision to form an independent political party named the Travancore State Congress, Pattom A. Thanu Pillai as its president and P. Nataraj Pillai as the Secretary. The committee also constituted a temporary committee by selecting the state congress came into existence with a decision to initiate the agitation in Travancore.

Legacy
In his memorial, a library founded in his native city in Kollam district, called Changanassery Smaraka Granthasala.

References

19th-century Indian judges
1877 births
Indian independence activists from Kerala
Malayali politicians
1935 deaths
Indian social reformers
People from Changanassery
Politicians from Kottayam
Scholars from Kerala
20th-century Indian judges
Vazhappally
History of Changanassery

ml:ചങ്ങനാശ്ശേരി പരമേശ്വരൻ പിള്ള